Camillo Berneri (also known as Camillo da Lodi; May 28, 1897 – May 5, 1937) was an Italian professor of philosophy, anarchist militant, propagandist and theorist. He was assassinated during the Spanish Civil War, presumably on the orders from Stalin's USSR.

Biography

Early years 
Camillo Berneri was born in Lodi on May 20, 1897. His father was a local redshirt official from Brescia, his mother was a primary school teacher from Emilia and his grandfather was a Carbonari and a follower of Giuseppe Mazzini. His childhood was marked by physical suffering. In just a few months, he became malnourished. In 1904, Camillo fell ill with typhoid fever, and later gastroenteritis. He moved with his family first to Milan, then to Palermo, to Forlì, to Varallo Sesia and, finally, to Reggio Emilia. Here, in 1912, Berneri became a member of the Reggio Emilia Socialist Youth Federation. He joined its Central Committee and collaborated with the federation's national organ. But after intense discussions, in particular with Torquato Gobbi, a bookbinder and member of the International Committee of Anarchist Actions, he left the federation in 1915. In an open letter, Berneri criticized the group for its red tape and "lack of devotion." In 1916 he moved to Arezzo where he attended high school.

Berneri joined the Italian anarchist movement. He described his departure from socialism with the words: “The ideal worker of Marxism or socialism is a mythical figure. It stems from the metaphysics of socialist romanticism and is not historically proven.” He was struck by the gesture of his comrades, who, despite leaving, wanted him to chair their last meeting in Reggio, and the gesture of his mentor Camillo Prampolini, who called him to find out the reasons for their disagreement. Berneri would always point to “pleasant memories of the socialist period.” In 1916, he moved to Arezzo, where he graduated from high school.

On January 4, 1917, he married in Giovanna Caleffi, his mother's former pupil. Three months after the wedding, he was called up for military service, however, he was removed from service due to a serious illness. After three years of military service, he was forced to leave the Military Academy of Modena because of his anti-militarist activities. Under protection, he was sent to the front and twice brought before a military court. In 1919 he was confined to the island of Pianosa because of his participation in a general strike on July 20–21, 1919. Dismissed from the army in 1919, he began to work diligently with the anarchist press and participated in the creation of the Union of Italian Anarchists. Being a convinced anti-militarist, he wrote: “slaughter, robbery, rape, this is war! To satisfy his lust, the vile person takes on the courage that leaves him when he must save his neighbor from danger or start a dangerous and painful business. In a warmed-up and blood-soaked atmosphere of war, an ordinary person falls into barbarism, and sometimes even turns into a beast.” In 1920, he actively participated in the seizure of factories in Northern Italy. He also made friends with Errico Malatesta and Luigi Fabbri.

After the war, he graduated from the University of Florence, where Camillo was a student of Gaetano Salvemini. He then became a professor of philosophy at the university and later went on to teach philosophy at Camerino.

When the fascists seized power, Camillo refused to be loyal to the regime. Berneri's aversion to fascism was ready and decisive, he maintained contact with the Florentine anti-fascists. Berneri's activity in the Union of Italian Anarchists was very intense in those years. When the fascist dictatorship intensified, in May 1926, Berneri was forced to flee the country to France. His wife, Giovanna Berneri, and his daughters Marie Louise Berneri and Giliana Berneri joined him soon after.

Emigration and police harassment 
Berneri was arrested in April 1927, after an international conference in L'Haÿ-les-Roses. On December 11, 1928, he was expelled from France and until 1930 was constantly harassed by the Belgian, French, Dutch, German and Luxembourg police during subsequent transfers and spent a lot of time in prison. He received a residence permit in France only in 1935, shortly before leaving for Spain. However, he continued to be widely published in the anarchist press in Italy, Switzerland, the United States and France.

Despite all his limitations, this period allowed him to read books on various topics such as science, psychology and teleology. He wrote anti-religious articles and brochures as well as pieces on the emancipation of women. He also completed his dissertation, The Anti-Semitic Jew, where he studied the forced or voluntary assimilation of Jews. The poet Andre Speer, considered this book “of paramount importance”. Other important writings of his during this time were Spying, Fascist Spying Abroad and Mussolini conquering the Balearic Islands.

He also wrote about anarchism, where he defends personal positions:

Spanish Civil War 

Once the Spanish Civil War broke out, Berneri was among the first to rush to Catalonia, the center of a revolution spearheaded by the Confederación Nacional del Trabajo (CNT) and Federación Anarquista Ibérica (FAI). There he found himself alongside Carlo Rosselli with a large number of Italian and International anti-fascists. Beyond militant solidarity, Carlo Rosselli was tied to his critical support for the prospects of Bolshevism, while in those years Camillo Berneri collaborated with the clandestine organ of the libertarian socialist movement "Giustizia e Libertà", arguing with Rosselli on the stark differences between libertarian socialism and despotic socialism. Together with Rosselli, he organized the first column of Italian volunteers to fight on the Aragon front, which were incorporated into the militia column of Joaquín Ascaso. On August 28, 1936, Camillo Berneri took part in Battle of Monte Pelado near Huesca: “We defended our position with 130 people against 600, hardened and with strong weapons, for four hours of battle." He eventually needed to leave the front due to medical problems and returned to Barcelona, where he created and was editor-in-chief of the newspaper Class War, also collaborating in the CNT-FAI radio station in Barcelona. During his stay in Barcelona, Berneri came to be under the surveillance of OVRA, the secret police of fascist Italy.

Berneri was a staunch defender of the Spanish Revolution and was one of the first to argue that only an anti-capitalist struggle can counter fascism and that the problem with anti-fascism is the rejection of the principles of the Social revolution. He constantly reiterates that revolution must be won on social, not military, grounds. Thus, he opposed the militarization of the militias, which had brought the first victories against state forces. He stood against those who advocated the idea of “first beat Franco”, and stood for the close connection between the war and the social revolution: “Victory in war is necessary; however, the war will not be won by limiting the problem to the purely military conditions of victory, but by linking them to the political and social conditions of victory.  '

Berneri was also very critical of the CNT-FAI's participation in the Republican government. Berneri worried about the growing isolation of the revolutionary and libertarian achievements in Catalonia, Aragon and other regions, and fought vigorously for the close connection of war and revolution. Such is the substance of many of his articles and speeches, such as of the famous open letter to the anarchist Minister of Health Federica Montseny, who with three other anarchists participated in the government of Largo Caballero:

In his 1936 book Thought and Battle'', Berneri gave critical comments on the situation, warning of the danger of a Stalinist coup, and marked his surprise at the "anarchist government." His political suggestions for hitting the operational bases of fascism were numerous, though unheeded, such as proclaiming the independence of Morocco, coordinating military efforts and gradually strengthening socialization.

Political assassination 

Berneri was soon exposing the fierce repressions carried out by Stalinists that had prevailed since the advent of the government of Juan Negrín: the victims of massacres and disappearances included thousands of non-communists, anarchists and also non-Stalinist communists, like the POUM. On May 5, 1937, Camillo Berneri and his anarchist friend Francesco Barbieri were taken out of their apartment by a dozen plainclothes men with red armbands and policemen. The corpses of the two Italian anarchists were found riddled with bullets. Giovanna Berneri raised the children of Antonio Cieri, who also fell in Spain. On Camillo Berneri's death, the socialist leader Pietro Nenni wrote: "If the anarchist Berneri had fallen on a barricade in Barcelona, fighting against the popular government, we would have nothing to say, and in the severity of his destiny we would find the strict law of the revolution. But Berneri was assassinated, and we must say it".

Family 
Camillo Berneri was married to Giovanna Berneri, and was father of Marie-Louise Berneri and Giliana Berneri, all of whom were also anarchists.

See also 
Anarchism in Italy

Further reading

References

External links 
 Writings of Camillo Berneri
 Camillo Berneri, Regarding our critiques of Bolshevism, 1922.
 Camillo Berneri, Abstentionism and anarchism, 1936.

Berneri Archive 

1897 births
1937 deaths
People from Lodi, Lombardy
Italian anarchists
Italian anti-capitalists
Anarcho-communists
19th-century Italian journalists
Italian male journalists
Murdered anarchists
Italian people of the Spanish Civil War
Italian people murdered abroad
Deaths by firearm in Spain
People murdered in Spain
Academic staff of the University of Florence
20th-century Italian philosophers
Italian military personnel of World War I
Italian exiles